Concavocephalus is a genus of Asian dwarf spiders that was first described by K. Y. Eskov in 1989.  it contains only two species: C. eskovi and C. rubens.

See also
 List of Linyphiidae species

References

Araneomorphae genera
Linyphiidae
Spiders of Russia